Youngstown State University (YSU or Youngstown State) is a public university in Youngstown, Ohio. It was founded in 1908 and is the easternmost member of the University System of Ohio.

The university is composed of six undergraduate colleges and a graduate college. Youngstown State University has over 150 undergraduate degree programs and 50 graduate degree programs serving over 11,000 students in studies up to the doctoral level. Beyond its current student body, the university has more than 125,000 alumni across the country and around the world.

Collectively known as the Penguins, Youngstown State's athletic teams compete in Division I of the National Collegiate Athletic Association.  The university is a member of the Horizon League in all varsity sports, with the exception of football which competes in the Football Championship Subdivision of the NCAA as a member of the Missouri Valley Football Conference, bowling which competes in the Southland Bowling League, and lacrosse which competes in the Mid-American Conference (MAC).

History

Founding
The university's origins trace back to 1908, when the local branch of the YMCA established a school of law within the Youngstown Association School. In 1921, the school became known as the Youngstown Institute of Technology and offered its first evening courses. In 1928, a year after establishing a College of Arts and Sciences, the institute once again changed its name to Youngstown College.  In 1955, the name was changed again to Youngstown University to reflect the school's broadening curriculum. A private, for profit Youngstown College was formed in 1987 and had no affiliation with YSU. It closed its doors in mid 2000 due to financial issues.

On September 1, 1967, after becoming a public institution, Youngstown University became officially known as Youngstown State University.  The following spring, YSU opened a Graduate School and College of Applied Science and Technology. In 1974, the College of Fine and Performing Arts was established.

Campus

YSU lies on a  campus just north of downtown Youngstown. Although it is not located near any outstanding geographical features, that has not stopped Youngstown State's campus from being noted for its landscaping, which is dissimilar from that of many other urban universities. YSU's geographical center has a park-like atmosphere, featuring a rather-hilly terrain and a variety of trees and plant life, as well as tables and chairs that surround a campus fountain.
Most buildings on campus have been built within the last half-century, making them newer than most buildings in downtown Youngstown, where most buildings were constructed before the Great Depression.

Kilcawley Center is primarily a student-resource and community-center on campus. It features reading and study rooms, computer labs, a copying center, a variety of restaurants (including a Chick-Fil-A, Wendy's and Dunkin' Donuts), and many student-affairs offices. Offices for many university student media outlets are housed here, including student newspaper The Jambar, student magazine The Yo, and student radio Rookery Radio. There are also many meeting and seminar rooms, which can be rented out for community events.

Historic buildings

Jones Hall, often the building that welcomes those coming onto YSU's campus, is one of the campus' oldest buildings, having been built in 1931, when YSU was still known as Youngstown College. Its history as the "main building" of the campus continues today, as it is perhaps the best-known and most photographed building of the whole campus. The building was renamed Jones Hall in honor of the institution's first president, Dr. Howard Jones. Today, the building is used as administrative office space.

In 2013, the former Wick Pollock Inn – located on Wick Avenue, next to Bliss Hall – was converted into The University President's House. The three-year project to renovate the mansion cost YSU over $4 million.

Administrative
Tod Hall – Tod Hall houses the administrative offices of many university officials, including the president, provost, and the Board of Trustees, as well as the Offices of Assessment, Marketing Communications, Human Resources, and others.
Fok Hall – Fok Hall houses the YSU Honors College, which consists of administrative offices and classrooms. Built in 1893, Fok Hall is listed on the National Register of Historic Places and is the oldest building on campus. Previously the Alumni Building, Fok Hall was renamed in 2014 after a $2.5 million donation to the university by Maria Fok, whose late husband was a professor and trustee of YSU.
Veterans Resource Center – The first facility of its kind at any university in Ohio, the 6,000 sq. ft., fully handicap-accessible Veterans Resource Center houses the Office of Veteran Affairs, as well as lounges, computer labs, and community spaces reserved for student veterans, currently serving members of the military, and military-dependent students.
Melnick Hall – Home to the YSU Foundation, Melnick Hall is also home to the university's public radio station, WYSU-FM 88.5, which is affiliated with NPR and American Public Media.
Sweeney Hall – Constructed in 1908, Sweeney Hall (formerly Dana Hall) houses the offices of Undergraduate Admissions.
E. J. Salata Complex – The E. J. Salata Complex houses almost all of the university's maintenance and utility services, including Construction, Grounds, Mail, and Printing Services.
Clingan-Waddell Hall – Clingan-Waddell Hall houses the YSU Police Department.

Facilities
Bliss Hall – Bliss Hall is the home of the Cliffe College of Creative Arts, including the Departments of Art, Theater & Dance, and the Dana School of Music. This building also houses the Department of Communication with programs in communication studies, journalism, and telecommunication studies. The building, completed in 1977, features the 390-seat Ford Theatre, the 248 seat Bliss Recital Hall, an experimental theatre, 80 practice rooms with Steinway pianos, TV studio, and audio production labs, as well as the Judith Rae Solomon Gallery, and fully equipped ceramics, photography, metals, and other artistic studios.
Moser Hall – Moser Hall, built in 1967, houses the College of Science, Technology, Engineering and Mathematics (STEM). The hall is home to the Departments of Geology, Environmental Science, and Engineering, as well as the Clarence R. Smith Mineral Museum.
Beeghly Hall – Beeghly Hall, home to the Beeghly College of Education, was completed in 1998 at a cost of $14 million. The hall also houses a 400-seat auditorium and the Wilcox Curriculum Resource Center. Beeghly Hall hosts several programs that are open to the community, such as the Community Counseling Center.
Williamson Hall – Williamson Hall houses the Williamson College of Business Administration. Completed before the fall semester of 2010, it houses all of the college's classrooms and offices, which were previously located in the Lincoln Building. Williamson Hall, a LEED-certified facility, was one of the most expensive additions to campus, with a large portion of the funding coming from donations. The building is located off of Rayen Ave and was purposely built to connect downtown businesses to the college and to the campus core. The Hall also houses several entrepreneurial organizations
Meshel Hall – Meshel Hall is the home of the Department of Computer Science and Information Systems, as well as the Offices of the Bursar, Registrar, and Financial Aid & Scholarships.
Cushwa Hall – The Bitonte College of Health and Human Services is housed in Cushwa Hall, along with the Peace Officer Training Academy. One of the largest buildings on campus, Cushwa Hall is also home to medical exhibits from the Rose Melnick Medical Museum.
DeBartolo Hall – DeBartolo Hall is home to the College of Liberal Arts and Social Sciences. The hall houses the departments of psychology, English, economics, philosophy, religious studies, political science, sociology, anthropology, Africana studies, women's studies, and the Center for Peace and Conflict Studies.
Lincoln Building – Lincoln Building is home to the Department of Mathematics and Statistics, and houses the Math Assistance Center and the offices of Distance Education/Metro Credit.
Maag Library – The Maag Library opened its doors in 1976 and was named after one of the local public library and Youngstown State University's trustees, William F. Maag, Jr.. A few years before its doors opened, Maag Library became a Federal Depository for government documents in 1971. Currently, it is a six-story building boasting over 500,000 volumes in house, as well as access to the collections of 84 other Ohio institutions, via participation in the OhioLINK program. The building also houses the Writing Center and the university's English Language Institute.
Phelps Building – The Phelps Building houses the Departments of Geography and Urban & Regional Studies, as well as YSU's Center for Human Resources Development.
Fedor Hall – Fedor Hall houses the Rich Center for Autism and Wee Care Day Care.
Christman Dining Commons – Christman Dining Commons, YSU's only residential dining hall, is located in the Anne K. Christman Campus Green between Cafaro and Lyden Houses.
Coffelt Hall – Coffelt Hall, also on the National Register of Historic Places, was constructed in 1933 and is home to the College of Graduate Studies.
Ward Beecher Hall - Ward Beecher Hall houses the departments of Biology, Chemistry, and Physics and Astronomy. The five-story original unit was constructed in 1958, a major addition was built in 1967 and a small addition comprising chemical storerooms was completed in 1997. The building contains 31 laboratories, including a planetarium and greenhouse, nine classrooms, 53 faculty-research rooms and a conference/seminar room. Ward Beecher houses the university's planetarium, which opened in 1967 and was recently renovated. The $750,000 upgrade included new seats (145), a SciDome fulldome video projector from Spitz, Inc., as well as a Chronos star projector from GOTO. The star projector, which replicates the night sky onto the planetarium's 40-foot (12 m) diameter dome, cost $489,000.

The planetarium is the location of the introductory astronomy courses at YSU, which registers almost 1,000 students every year. It has housed over 500,000 students, as well as 750,000 visitors as of 2007. Organized shows are available for groups during the week, and scheduled shows available Friday and Saturday evenings (with shows geared toward younger audiences on Saturday afternoons). All shows are free of charge.

Museums archives and historical collections
The McDonough Museum of Art is one of two art museums located in Youngstown, Ohio. The McDonough Museum of Art is closely affiliated with the university, acting as an outreach for the Department of Art. The 14,000 sq. ft. space serves as a showing facility for art students and faculty alike, as well as local and regional talents.

The Butler Institute of American Art is located on Wick Avenue in Youngstown, Ohio. Falling directly on YSU's campus, it is the flagship art museum of the city.

Archives and Special Collections 

Located on the fifth floor of Maag Library the Archives and Special Collections at Youngstown State is meant to preserve items with historical significance to the school, Youngstown and Mahoning County, Ohio as well as its rich history in the iron and steel industry, and the people that call it home. The Archives and Special Collections library is home to many rare and fragile books from the library's collection as well as items from Youngstown State University's history.

Academics
The university comprises the following colleges, as of the Spring 2022 academic reorganization:
Beeghly College of Liberal Arts, Social Science & Education
 Bitonte College of Health and Human Services
 Cliffe College of Creative Arts
 College of Science, Technology, engineering, and Mathematics
 Williamson College of Business Administration
 College of Graduate Studies
 Sokolov Honors College

YSU offers doctoral degrees in educational leadership and physical therapy as well as a doctorate in mathematics in cooperation with Rhodes University. Together with the University of Akron and Kent State University, YSU sponsors the Northeast Ohio Medical University, a BS-MD program. YSU engineering students may pursue doctoral studies in cooperation with the University of Akron and Cleveland State University. In addition, YSU has 35 masters programs and over 100 undergraduate majors.

The Dana School of Music at Youngstown State University was deemed an "All-Steinway" school in 2004. The Dana School of Music is one of the oldest non-conservatory schools of music in the United States.

The Williamson College of Business is accredited by the Association to Advance Collegiate Schools of Business (AACSB).

In addition to traditional four year programs Youngstown State University also offers online degree programs and three-year degree pathways.

Administration

Labor relations
Labor unions are very active at YSU and include most non-administrative faculty and staff on campus. In August 2005, just before the start of the 2005–06 academic year, two of four campus unions were on strike. Following the conclusion of the strike, relations remained strained, with some faculty and staff calling for the resignation of YSU president David Sweet in May 2007. Others on campus thought some individuals on both sides were engaged in less than professional behaviors. Due to the animosity between the parties, a special committee was set up to examine labor relations. This committee recommended that the negotiations teams for all sides be replaced before the next round of contract negotiations. After the committee's recommendations, the vice president for administration was replaced, as well as the executive director of human resources.

Relations have improved since that time and are now typical of what one would expect of a unionized campus in a region that has always been at the center of US union activism.

Student life

Housing
The university has been looking to increase the amount of available student housing on campus. As of September 2015, there were less than 1,500 student beds available for the more than 12,200 students enrolled. In June 2015, it was announced that a $7.8 million, 162-bed, four-story, privately owned, student housing complex named University Edge YSU would be built on West Rayen Avenue between Fifth and Belmont avenues by Hallmark Campus Communities of Columbus and Fortress Real Estate Co. of Atlanta. Construction started in late September 2015. In December 2015, it was announced that another apartment complex would be coming to YSU. LRC Realty announced the $10 million, 163-bed, five story, privately, owned retail/student housing complex, called The Enclave, was built on nearly 2 acres between Lincoln and Wick avenues in Youngstown. A Representative for LRC Realty said that the building includes a fitness center and an outdoor patio for student residents. The complex opened for occupancy in August 2018.

Cafaro House – Cafaro House, completed in 1995, offers priority to students in the Youngstown State University Honors College, academic learning communities, and the BS/MD program. The building houses 283 students, with free laundry facilities, game room, fitness room, student lounge, music practice rooms, academic seminar spaces, and computer lounge with printing. The building is located alongside Lyden House, north of the main campus. It is located at 205 Madison Ave.
Kilcawley House – Kilcawley House is attached to Kilcawley Center, is co-ed by floor, and is equipped with a game room, lounges, fitness space, and two music practice rooms. It is located at 117 University Plaza and can house 226 residents.
Lyden House – Lyden House, completed in 1991, can house up to 334 residents, is co-ed by wing, and has several lounges throughout the building, alongside fitness and game rooms, and public computer lounge with printing.
Wick House – Wick House, built in 1906, is located near the Butler Museum of Art, and the Arms Family Museum of Local History. This four-story mansion can house up to 32 upper class students. It is located at 656 Wick Ave. Building has laundry room, recreation space, and public computers with printing.
Weller House – Weller House is located along Wick Avenue, and offers 16 apartment-style, on-campus living, with each unit having a full bathroom and fully furnished kitchen. Apartments are exclusively for non-traditional students, graduate students and students with families. Ideal for students on a budget.
Buechner Hall – Buechner Hall is a privately owned and operated woman's residence hall located near the heart of campus. The building houses up to 75 women in single and double rooms. This building also provides its own dining services, offering 15 meals per week in house.
University Courtyard Apartments – The University Courtyard Apartments, on the east side of the campus (behind Bliss Hall), were built in 2004, and are privately owned and operated apartments, not affiliated with housing services at YSU. Both buildings house up to 200 students with two and four bedroom units. Spaces aren't exclusively rented to YSU students.

Greek life
Youngstown State University is home to three Greek councils; Interfraternity Council (IFC), National Panhellenic Conference (NPC), and the National Pan-Hellenic Council (NPHC).

Fraternities and sororities
Fraternities:
Alpha Phi Delta
Sigma Alpha Epsilon
Sigma Tau Gamma
Sigma Chi
Theta Chi

Sororities:
Alpha Omicron Pi
Alpha Xi Delta
Delta Zeta
Zeta Tau Alpha

Pan-Hellenic Conference
Alpha Kappa Alpha
Delta Sigma Theta
Zeta Phi Beta
Phi Sigma Rho

Pan-Hellenic Council
Omega Psi Phi

Student body
As of fall 2019, the student body totaled approximately 12,155, 10% of whom were dual-enrolled high school students. YSU has approximately 2,100 full and part-time employees, and 426 full-time faculty with 543 part-time faculty.  165 faculty members boast full-professor rank, with 79% of the instructors holding doctorates or terminal degrees. The university boasts a student to faculty ratio of 14:1.

Once seen as primarily a commuter school, Youngstown State University has a growing number of student housing available both on and off campus. About 1.5% of the student body are international students from approximately 45 countries.

YSU has participated in the Youngstown Early College program, through which students from the Youngstown City School District can take courses for college credit while in high school. Youngstown Early college has had their first graduating class in Spring 2008. YSU is no longer affiliated with Youngstown Early College. Eastern Gateway Community College assumed full operations in 2013.

Centers and institutes
YSU operates several Centers of Excellence and designated research and economic development programs, including the Center for Transportation and Materials Engineering, the Center of Excellence in Materials Science and Engineering, the Center of Excellence in International Business, the Center for Applied Chemical Biology, the Institute for Applied Topology, and effective in 2012, the Natural Gas and Water Resources Institute.

Youngstown State University is also home to the Center for Working Class Studies and offers a Regional and American Studies program, which was the first of its kind in the United States.  The school assisted the University of Chicago in developing a similar program.

The university's Center for Judaic and Holocaust Studies was put into jeopardy when Jacob Ari Labendz, the only professor at YSU qualified to teach Holocaust studies, was laid off in 2021.

Athletics
Youngstown State has a number of men's and women's sports teams, including baseball, basketball, cross country, football, golf, swimming, diving, tennis, track and field, volleyball, softball, soccer, lacrosse, and bowling.

Football
The Youngstown State Penguins Football team represents Youngstown State University in college football. Youngstown State currently plays as a member of the NCAA at the NCAA Division I Football Championship Subdivision (formerly known as Division I-AA) and are a member of the Missouri Valley Football Conference (MVFC). The Penguins have played their home games in Stambaugh Stadium, more commonly called "The Ice Castle," since 1982.

YSU football has been one of the leading programs in NCAA Division I Football Championship Subdivision, winning four national championships under former head coach Jim Tressel (currently YSU president), which is third behind North Dakota State's seven titles and Georgia Southern's six. Overall, YSU has made 11 playoff appearances since Division I FCS was formed in 1978.

Basketball
The Youngstown State Penguins Women's Basketball and Youngstown State Penguins Men's Basketball teams represent Youngstown State University in Youngstown, Ohio. The teams currently competes in the Horizon League, of which it they have been members since 2001. The women's team has appeared in the NCAA Division I Tournament three times. The men's team has appeared in the NCAA Division II Tournament nine times and the NAIA tournament four times.

Facilities

The Youngstown State Penguins is the name given to the athletic teams of YSU. The university is a member of the National Collegiate Athletic Association's (NCAA) Division I, and the Penguins compete in football as members of the Missouri Valley Football Conference. Most other sports compete as members of the Horizon League.

Stambaugh Stadium
The Arnold D. Stambaugh Stadium is an on-campus, multi-purpose stadium. Built in 1982, the stadium is primarily used as a home for the Youngstown State Penguins football team. Between 1996 and 2013, the stadium also was home to the YSU Women's soccer team. At present, the total capacity of the stadium is 20,630 people. The structure also houses the university's ROTC branch, as well as the DeBartolo Stadium Club, which overlooks the city of Youngstown and is available for events.

Beeghly Center
The Beeghly Physical Education Center, commonly called "Beeghly Center," is a 6,300-seat, multi-purpose arena built in 1972. Home of the department of kinesiology and sports sciences, it includes an Olympic-sized swimming pool, racquetball and squash courts, as well as administrative offices. The center hosted a Barack Obama campaign rally in February 2008.Softball Complex

Completed in 2014, this complex houses the softball team and seats more than 200 spectators.

Andrews Student Recreation and Wellness Center
The Andrews Student Recreation and Wellness Center is the main recreational facility on campus, and is available to all students and staff members. The building boasts Ohio's tallest rock wall (53 feet), as well as free-weight and cardio gyms, meditation and aerobics studios, four indoor multi-purpose courts, and an indoor track. The AWRC is also hosts intramural sports, as well as training and exercise classes.

Watson and Tressel Training Site
The Watson and Tressel Training Site, completed in 2011, is one of the largest and newest buildings of its kind in the Horizon league. Facilities at WATTS include a turf football field, track, long-jump and high-jump pits as well as practice sites for baseball, football, track, softball, golf, and soccer.

Eastwood Field
Eastwood Field is an off-campus, minor-league baseball stadium, that hosts the Youngstown State Penguins Baseball team. The stadium is located in the Eastwood Mall complex in Niles, Ohio.

People

Alumni

References

External links

Youngstown State University athletics website

 
1908 establishments in Ohio
Buildings and structures in Youngstown, Ohio
Educational institutions established in 1908
Education in Mahoning County, Ohio
Education in Youngstown, Ohio
Public universities and colleges in Ohio
Tourist attractions in Youngstown, Ohio
Universities and colleges founded by the YMCA